Bruno Bilde (born 22 September 1976) is a French politician serving as the member of the National Assembly for the 12th constituency of Pas-de-Calais since 2017. He is a member of the National Rally (RN).

Career
Bilde served as a regional councillor of Lorraine (2004–2010), Nord-Pas-de-Calais (2010–2015) and Hauts-de-France (2016–2017). He was one of the five openly LGBT members of the National Assembly elected during the 2017 legislative election.

He is in a relationship with fellow National Rally politician Steeve Briois.

References

1976 births
Living people
Deputies of the 15th National Assembly of the French Fifth Republic
National Rally (France) politicians
Politicians from Nancy, France
Politicians from Hauts-de-France
LGBT legislators in France
LGBT conservatism
Members of Parliament for Pas-de-Calais
Candidates for the 2022 French legislative election